Hydromyles is a monotypic genus of small sea slugs, marine opisthobranch gastropod molluscs in the family Hydromylidae.

Hydromyles species are pelagic, carnivorous and viviparous. They are found in waters around Japan, South Korea, eastern Australia, Indonesia, Papua New Guinea, and the Philippines.

See also
 Sea angel

References

Hydromylidae

Gastropods described in 1825
Molluscs of the Pacific Ocean
Marine molluscs of Asia